The Chibchan languages (also Chibchan, Chibchano) make up a language family indigenous to the Isthmo-Colombian Area, which extends from eastern Honduras to northern Colombia and includes populations of these countries as well as Nicaragua, Costa Rica, and Panama. The name is derived from the name of an extinct language called Chibcha or Muysccubun, once spoken by the people who lived on the Altiplano Cundiboyacense of which the city of Bogotá was the southern capital at the time of the Spanish Conquista. However, genetic and linguistic data now indicate that the original heart of Chibchan languages and Chibchan-speaking peoples might not have been in Colombia, but in the area of the Costa Rica-Panama border, where the greatest variety of Chibchan languages has been identified.

External relations
A larger family called Macro-Chibchan, which would contain the Misumalpan languages, Xinca, and Lenca, was found convincing by Kaufman (1990).

Pache (2018) suggests a distant relationship with the Macro-Jê languages.

Language contact
Jolkesky (2016) notes that there are lexical similarities with the Andaki, Barbakoa, Choko, Duho, Paez, Sape, and Taruma language families due to contact.

Classification
 A
 Waimí (Guaymi)
 Guaymí (Ngäbere, Movere) – 170,000 speakers, vulnerable in Panama, endangered in Costa Rica
 Buglere (Bokotá) – 18,000 speakers, endangered
 Borũca (Brunca) – 140 speakers, moribund
 Talamanca
 Huetar (Güetar) †
 Bribri (Talamanca), 7,000 speakers – vulnerable in Costa Rica, endangered in Panama
 Cabécar (Talamanca) – 8,800 speakers, vulnerable
 Teribe (Norteño) – 3,300 speakers, endangered
 B
 Pech (Paya) – 990 speakers, endangered
 Dorasque †
 Votic
 Rama – 740 speakers, moribund
 Voto †
 Maléku (Guatuso) – 750 speakers, endangered
 Corobicí – northwestern Costa Rica †
 Cuna–Colombian
 Kuna (Dulegaya) – 60,600 speakers, vulnerable in Panama, endangered in Colombia
 Chibcha–Motilon
 Barí (Motilón) – 5,000 speakers, vulnerable
 Chibcha–Tunebo
 Muysccubun - †
 Duit †
 U'wa (Tunebo) – 2,550 speakers, endangered
 Guane † – Colombia
 Arwako–Chimila
 Chimila – 350 speakers, endangered
 Arwako
 Wiwa (Malayo, Guamaca) – 1,850 speakers, endangered
 Kankuamo †
 Arhuaco (Ika) – 8,000 speakers, vulnerable
 Kogi (Cogui) – 9,910 speakers, vulnerable

The extinct languages of Antioquia, Old Catío and Nutabe have been shown to be Chibchan (Adelaar & Muysken, 2004:49). The language of the Tairona is unattested, apart from a single word, but may well be one of the Arwako languages still spoken in the Santa Marta range. The Zenú  Sinú language of northern Colombia is also sometimes included, as are the Malibu languages, though without any factual basis.

Adolfo Constenla Umaña argues that Cueva, the extinct dominant language of Pre-Columbian Panama long assumed to be Chibchan based on a misinterpreted Kuna vocabulary, was actually Chocoan, but there is little evidence.

The Cofán language (Kofán, Kofane, A'i) of Ecuador and Colombia has been erroneously included in Chibchan due to borrowed vocabulary.

Jolkesky (2016)
Internal classification by Jolkesky (2016):

(† = extinct)

Chibcha
Pech
Votic
Maleku
Rama
Wetar
Isthmus
Boruka-Talamanca
Boruka
Talamanca
Teribe
Bribri-Kabekar
Bribri
Kabekar
Doraske-Changena
Changena †
Doraske
Guaymi
Buglere
Ngäbe
Kuna
Kuna Paya-Pukuro
Kuna San Blas
Magdalena
Barí
Chimila
Nutabe †
Tunebo
Muisca
Guane †
Muisca 
Sierra de Santa Marta
Kaggaba
Tairona †
Wiwa-Ika
Ika
Kankuamo †
Wiwa

Varieties
Below is a full list of Chibchan language varieties listed by Loukotka (1968), including names of unattested varieties.

Rama group
Rama - language spoken around Bluefields Lagoon and on the Rama River, Nicaragua.
Melchora - extinct language once spoken on the San Juan Melchoras River, Nicaragua. (Unattested.)

Guatuso group
Guatuso - spoken on the Frío River, Costa Rica, now perhaps extinct.
Guetar / Brusela - extinct language once spoken on the Grande River, Costa Rica.
Suerre / Camachire / Chiuppa - extinct language once spoken on the Tortuguero River, Costa Rica. (Benzoni 1581, p. 214, only five words.)
Pocosi - extinct language once spoken on the Matina River and around the modern city of Puerto Limón, Costa Rica. (Unattested.)
Voto - extinct language once spoken at the mouth of the San Juan River, Costa Rica. (Unattested.)
Quepo - extinct language once spoken in Costa Rica on the Pacuare River. (W. Lehmann 1920, vol. 1, p. 238, only one single word.)
Corobisi / Corbesi / Cueresa / Rama de rio Zapote - spoken by a few individuals in Costa Rica on the Zapote River. (Alvarez in Conzemius 1930, pp. 96–99.)

Talamanca group
Terraba / Depso / Quequexque / Brurán - extinct language once spoken in Costa Rica on the Tenorio River.
Tirub / Rayado / Tiribi - extinct language spoken once in Costa Rica on the Virilla River.
Bribri / Lari - spoken on the Coca River and Tarire River, Costa Rica.
Estrella - Spanish name of an extinct language, the original name of which is unknown, once spoken on the Estrella River, Costa Rica.
Cabecar - language spoken on the Moy River, Costa Rica.
Chiripó - language spoken in Costa Rica on the Matina River and Chirripó River.
Viceyta / Abiseta / Cachi / Orosi / Tucurrique - extinct language once spoken on the Tarire River, Costa Rica.
Brunca / Boruca / Turucaca - extinct language of Costa Rica, spoken on the Grande River and in the Boruca region.
Coto / Cocto - extinct language once spoken between the sources of the Coto River and Grande River, Costa Rica. (Unattested.)

Dorasque group
Chumulu - extinct language once spoken in El Potrero, Veraguas (Potrero de Vargas), Panama.
Gualaca - extinct language once spoken on the Chiriqui River, Panama.
Changuena - once spoken in Panama, on the Changuena River.

Guaymi group
Muoi - extinct language once spoken in the Miranda Valley of Panama.
Move / Valiente - now spoken on the Guaymi River and in the Veragua Peninsula.
Norteño - dialect without an aboriginal name, spoken on the northern coast of Panama, now perhaps extinct.
Penonomeño - once spoken in the village of Penonemé.
Murire / Bucueta / Boncota / Bogota - spoken in the Serranía de Tabasara by a few families.
Sabanero / Savaneric / Valiente - extinct dialect without aboriginal name, once spoken on the plains south of the Serranía de Tabasara.
Pariza - extinct dialect spoken in the Conquest days on the Veragua Peninsula. (G. Espinosa 1864, p. 496, only one single word.)

Cuna group
Coiba - extinct language once spoken on the Chagres River, Panama. (W. Lehmann 1920, vol. I, pp. 112–122; A. Santo Tomas 1908, pp. 124–128, only five words.)
Cuna / Bayano / Tule / Mandingo / San Blas / Karibe-Kuna / Yule - language spoken in eastern Panama, especially on the Bayano River, in San Blas and the small islands on the northern coast.
Cueva / Darien - extinct language Once spoken at the mouth of the Atrato River, Colombia.
Chochama - extinct language once spoken on the Suegro River, Panama. (Unattested.)

Antioquia group
Guazuzú - once spoken in the Sierra de San Jerónimo, department of Antioquia, Colombia. (Unattested.)
Oromina / Zeremoe - extinct language once spoken south of the Gulf of Urabá, Antioquia, Colombia. (Unattested.)
Catio - once spoken in the region of Dabaiba, Colombia. (only a few words.)
Hevejico - once spoken in the Tonusco and Ebéjico Valleys. (Unattested.)
Abibe - once spoken in the Sierra de Abibe. (Unattested.)
Buritaca - once spoken at the sources of the Sucio River. (Unattested.)
Caramanta - once spoken around the city of Caramanta.
Cartama - once spoken around the modern city of Cartama. (Unattested.)
Pequi - once spoken in the Pequi region. (Unattested.)
Arma - once spoken on the Pueblanco River. (Unattested.)
Poze - once spoken on the Pozo River and Pacova River. (Cieza de Leon 1881, p. 26, only one single word.)
Nutabé - once spoken in the San Andrés Valley.
Tahami - once spoken on the Magdalena River and Tora River. (Unattested.)
Yamesi - once spoken at the mouth of the Nechi River and on the Porce River. (Simon 1882-1892, vol. 5, p. 80, only one single word.)
Avurrá - once spoken in the Aburrá Valley. (Piedrahita (Fernandez de Piedrahita) 1688, cap. 2, f. 9, only one single word.)
Guamoco - once spoken around the modern city of Zaragoza, Antioquia. (Unattested.)
Anserma / Humbra / Umbra - once spoken on the Cauca River around the city of Anserma, Caldas. (J. Robledo 1865, pp. 389 and 392, only a few words.)
Amachi - once spoken in the San Bartolomé Valley. (Unattested.)

Chibcha group
Chibcha / Muisca / Mosca - extinct language once spoken on the upper plateau of Bogotá and Tunja, department of Cundinamarca, Colombia.
Duit dialect - once spoken on the Tunja River and Tundama River.
Tunebo / Tame - language now spoken by many tribes living in the area east of the Chibcha tribe. Dialects:
Tegría - spoken on the Tegría River, department of Boyaca. (Rochereau 1926-1927, 1946-1950, 1959.)
Pedraza - spoken on the Pedraza River.
Boncota - spoken on the Boncota River.
Manare - spoken on the Manare River.
Sinsiga / Chita - spoken in the village of Chita, Boyacá and on the Chisca River.
Uncasica - spoken in the Sierra Librada.
Morcote - spoken on the Tocaría River and in the village of Morcote. (Unattested.)
Chitarero - extinct language once spoken around the modern city of Pamplona, department of Santander. (Unattested.)
Lache - extinct language once spoken on the Chicamocha River and in the Sierra de Chita, department of Boyacá. (Unattested.)

Motilon group
Dobocubí / Motilon - spoken on the Tarra River and around the old mission of Atacarayo, department of Norte de Santander, Colombia.
Bartra / Cunaguasáya - spoken by a tribe on the Oro River, Rincón River, and Lora River in the Norte de Santander region.
Mape - spoken by a little known tribe on the Catatumbo River and Agua Blanca River in the Norte de Santander region and in the state of Zulia, Venezuela.

Arhuaco (Arwako) group
Tairona / Teyuna - extinct language once spoken on the Frio River and on the Caribbean coast, department of Magdalena, Colombia, now a secret language of the priests in the Cagaba tribe.
Zyuimakane - extinct language once spoken on the Volador River in the same region. (Unattested.)
Bungá - extinct language once spoken on the Santa Clara River. (Unattested.)
Ulabangui - once spoken on the Negro River, in the Santa Clara River region. (Unattested.)
Cashingui - once spoken on the Palomino River. (Unattested.)
Masinga - once spoken on the Bonda River, in the Palomino River region. (Unattested.)
Bonda / Matuna - once spoken on the Bonda River and Santa María River. (Holmer 1953a, p. 313, only one single word; Preuss 1927, only a few toponyms.)
Cágaba / Köggaba / Kaugia / Koghi - language spoken in the Sierra Nevada de Santa Marta in the villages of San Andrés, San Miguel, San José, Santa Rosa, and Pueblo Viejo.
Guamaca / Nábela / Sanha / Arsario - spoken in the Sierra Nevada de Santa Marta region in the villages of El Rosario, Potrerito, and Marocaso.
Bintucua / Ijca / Ika / Iku / Machaca / Vintukva - spoken in the Sierra Nevada de Santa Marta region in the village of San Sebastián (near Atanquez).
Atanque / Campanaque / Busintana / Buntigwa / Kallwama - spoken in the Sierra Nevada de Santa Marta, in the village of Atanquez.
Upar / Eurpari / Giriguana - extinct language once spoken on the César River. (Unattested.)
Cariachil - once spoken between the Molino River and Fonseca River. (Unattested.)
Ocanopán / Itoto - once spoken around Cerro Pintado. (Unattested.)

Paya group
Paya / Poyuai / Seco - language spoken on the Guayape River and between the Patuca River and Sico River, Honduras.

Proto-language
Pache (2018) is the most recent reconstruction of Proto-Chibchan. Other reconstructions include Holt (1986).

Constenla (1981)
Proto-Chibchan reconstructions by Constenla (1981):

Proto-Chibchan horticultural vocabulary (Constenla 2012):

 *dihke ‘to sow’
 *te1 ‘cultivated clearing’
 *ike ‘manioc’
 *tuʔ ‘tuber, yam’ (Dioscorea spp.; Xanthosoma sagittifolium)
 *apì ‘pumpkin, squash’
 *e, *ebe ‘maize’
 *du, *dua1 ‘tobacco’
 *tã1 ‘rattles from gourd’
 *toka ‘gourd cup’

Pache (2018)
Proto-Chibchan reconstructions by Pache (2018):

References

Bibliography
 Constenla Umaña, A. (1981). Comparative Chibchan Phonology. (Ph.D. dissertation, Department of Linguistics, University of Pennsylvania, Philadelphia).
 Constenla Umaña, A. (1985). Las lenguas dorasque y changuena y sus relaciones genealógicas. Filologia y linguística, 11.2:81-91.
 Constenla Umaña, Adolfo. (1991). Las lenguas del Área Intermedia: Introducción a su estudio areal. Editorial de la Universidad de Costa Rica, San José.
 Constenla Umaña, Adolfo. (1995). Sobre el estudio diacrónico de las lenguas chibchenses y su contribución al conocimiento del pasado de sus hablantes. Boletín del Museo del Oro 38–39: 13–56.
 Estudios de Lingüística Chibcha, a journal of Chibchan linguistics, is published by the Universidad de Costa Rica.
 Greenberg, Joseph H. (1987). Language in the Americas. Stanford: Stanford University Press.
 Headland, E. (1997). Diccionario bilingüe con una gramatica Uw Cuwa (Tunebo). Bogotá: Summer Institute of Linguistics.
 Holt, Dennis (1986). The Development of the Paya Sound-System. (Ph.D. dissertation, Department of Linguistics, University of California, Los Angeles).
 Margery Peña, E. (1982). Diccionario español-bribri, bribri-español. San José: Editorial Universidad de Costa Rica.
 Margery Peña, E. (1989). Diccionario Cabécar-Español, Español-Cabécar. Editorial de la Universidad de Costa Rica.
 Pinart, A. L. (1890). Vocabulario Castellano-Dorasque: Dialectos Chumulu, Gualaca y Changuina. (Petite Bibliothèque Américaine, 2). Paris: Ernest Leroux.
 Pinart, A. L. (1892). Vocabulario Guaymie: Dialectos Move-Valiente Norteño y Guaymie Penonomeño. (Petite Bibliothèque Américaine, 3). Paris: Ernest Leroux.
 Pinart, A. L. (1897). Vocabulario Guaymie: Dialectos Murıre-Bukueta, Mouı y Sabanero. (Petite Bibliothèque Américaine, 4). Paris: Ernest Leroux.
 Quesada, J. Diego (2007). The Chibchan Languages. Editorial Tecnológica de Costa Rica. .
 Quesada Pacheco, M. A.; Rojas Chaves, C. (1999). Diccionario boruca-español, español-boruca. San José: Editorial de la Universidad de Costa Rica.

External links

 Comparative Chibchan phonology — 1981 dissertation by Adolfo Constenla.

 
Language families
 
Indigenous languages of Central America
Indigenous languages of the South American Northeast
Macro-Chibchan languages